The 1908 Campeonato Paulista, organized by the LPF (Liga Paulista de Football), was the 7th season of São Paulo's top association football league. Paulistano won the title for the 2nd time. No teams were relegated and the top scorers were Internacional's Leônidas and Paulistano's Peres with 7 goals.

System
The championship was disputed in a double-round robin system, with the team with the most points winning the title.

Championship

References

Campeonato Paulista seasons
Paulista